Amir Hadžiahmetović (born 8 March 1997) is a Bosnian professional footballer who plays as a defensive midfielder for Süper Lig club Beşiktaş and the Bosnia and Herzegovina national team.

Hadžiahmetović started his professional career at Željezničar, before joining Konyaspor in 2016. Seven years later, he moved to Beşiktaş.

A former youth international for Bosnia and Herzegovina, Hadžiahmetović made his senior international debut in 2020, earning over 20 caps since.

Club career

Željezničar
Hadžiahmetović started playing football at his hometown club Nexø Boldklub, before joining youth academy of Bosnian team Željezničar in 2009. In July 2014, he signed his first professional contract with the side. He made his professional debut against Olimpic on 2 August at the age of 17. On 13 May 2015, he scored his first professional goal in a triumph over Mladost Velika Obarska.

Konyaspor
In February 2016, Hadžiahmetović was transferred to Turkish outfit Konyaspor for an undisclosed fee. He made his official debut for the team in Turkish Cup game against Beşiktaş on 10 February. Seven weeks later, he made his league debut against Gençlerbirliği. On 19 November, he scored his first goal for the side against Gaziantepspor. He won his first title with Konyaspor, club's first trophy ever, on 31 May 2017, by beating İstanbul Başakşehir in Turkish Cup final.

Hadžiahmetović played his 100th game for the team against Sivasspor on 21 June 2020.

In July 2021, he extended his contract until June 2024.

Beşiktaş
In February 2023, Hadžiahmetović moved to Beşiktaş on a deal until June 2027. He made his competitive debut for the club on 4 February against Sivasspor.

International career
Hadžiahmetović represented Bosnia and Herzegovina at all youth levels.

In August 2020, he received his first senior call-up, for 2020–21 UEFA Nations League games against Italy and Poland. He debuted against the former on 4 September.

Career statistics

Club

International

Honours
Konyaspor
Turkish Cup: 2016–17
Turkish Super Cup: 2017

References

External links

1997 births
Living people
People from Bornholm
Danish people of Bosnia and Herzegovina descent
Citizens of Bosnia and Herzegovina through descent
Bosnia and Herzegovina footballers
Bosnia and Herzegovina youth international footballers
Bosnia and Herzegovina under-21 international footballers
Bosnia and Herzegovina international footballers
Bosnia and Herzegovina expatriate footballers
Association football midfielders
FK Željezničar Sarajevo players
Konyaspor footballers
Beşiktaş J.K. footballers
Premier League of Bosnia and Herzegovina players
Süper Lig players
Expatriate footballers in Turkey
Bosnia and Herzegovina expatriate sportspeople in Turkey